Wrestling was one of the sports which was held at the 1986 Asian Games in Seoul, South Korea between 25 September and 4 October 1986. The competition included only men's events.

Medalists

Freestyle

Greco-Roman

Medal table

References
 FILA Database

 
1986 Asian Games events
1986
Asian Games
International wrestling competitions hosted by South Korea